A law firm network (law firm association or legal network) is a membership organisation consisting of independent law firms. These networks are one type of professional services networks similar to networks found in the accounting profession. The common purpose is to expand the resources available to each member for providing services to their clients. Prominent primarily law firm networks include CICERO League of International Lawyers, First Law International, Alliott Group (multidisciplinary), Lex Mundi, World Services Group (multidisciplinary), TerraLex, Meritas, Multilaw, The Network of Trial Law Firms, Inc., the State Capital Group, and Pacific Rim Advisory Council. The largest networks have more than 10,000 attorneys located in hundreds of offices worldwide.

The firms who are part of the networks may be formally or informally linked to one another depending upon the purpose of the network.

History of law firm networks 

There are two different reasons for networks developing in the legal profession. The first reason is that law firms needed international connections due to globalization in the 1990s. The second reason is expansion of many large United States firms to become "national". Smaller firms or firms with a niche practice requested expertise from these networks.

The internationalization of the legal profession began later than that of the accounting profession. Unlike accounting firms which conducted worldwide audits, law firms in each country were able to deal with national client matters. This changed in 1949, when Baker & McKenzie began to expand to non-United States markets to assist U.S. clients that were expanding overseas following WWII.

Internationalization was slow, because the legal profession was more restrictive than accounting in allowing foreign firms to enter and practice other countries. One of the requirements is that the names of the partners should be present in the name of the firm.

In the late 1980s, U.S. and English firms began establishing branches in the primary commercial centers. This new competition in local markets had the immediate effect of forcing local firms to evaluate alternative ways of providing services to their international clients.

The first international networks, called clubs, generally consisted of ten firms in different countries. The typical format was to hold several meetings a year among managing partners, to compare notes on management related issues. They were secretive networks because the members feared losing business from other firms. On the other hand, they would advertise to their clients that they had foreign connections and correspondents. Today the clubs are commonly known as "best friends networks". Examples today are Leading Counsel Network and Slaughter & May.

The clubs evolved into networks in the 1980s. The networks were not secretive and published directories, materials and brochures (Interlaw being one of the first examples). The members met annually. Some focused on specific practices, such as litigation, while others were more generic. Because networks were not thought of as strategic models, the membership selection process was not rigorous. This selection process is reflected today in the networks which have firms with a wide range of sizes, i.e., small firms in locations where there are firms three and four times the size of the country.

Lex Mundi was formed in 1989. It was the first network where each member had to be among the largest and most established firms in a state or country. It was a business that provided members with many alternatives to expand their resources. Lex Mundi is a network organized around strategic objectives, rather than objectives being defined after the network was established. While different from the accounting network, the concept was that of an entity which provided services to members and should also have an established brand. The staff, board, councils and members collaborated to achieve the objectives.

Other networks like TerraLex, Meritas also known as the Commercial Law Affiliates and International Jurists, soon followed. These networks operated as businesses. Their stated objective was to create a branded alternative to the large United States and English law firms that had expanded into their countries.

U.S. national networks also developed in the 1980s. The first national network was ALFA, which was a network focused primarily on insurance litigation. The second was the State Capital Law Firm Group which began as a national network of firms practicing in government affairs. To qualify for membership, the firms needed to have a former governor at the firms. Both of these networks became international, changing their names to State Capital Global Legal Network and to ALFA International.

Management structure
The typical network is run on a day-to-day basis by an administrative office called a secretariat or home office.

The head office is commonly located in major commercial centres in Europe or North America and does not practice law. Depending on the nature of the network (extension of the members or an independent business), the person responsible for the network will be an executive director or president/CEO.

The network may be governed by a board of directors. Networks also have representatives who form a management board with the executive director.

Membership
There are three different types of networks. The original large networks – Lex Mundi, ALFA, TerraLex, State Capital Group – tended to members who were large firms. This was because they were competing against large firms opening offices. Newer networks are more likely to include smaller firms. Specialty law firms may participate in boutique networks based upon their field of law.

Law firm networks may offer their members territorial exclusivity. When that occurs, another firm can not be admitted within their exclusive territory.

Network members may together have hundreds of offices. Firms listed in the list of largest U.S. law firms have at most 4,000 attorneys. The largest networks include more 10,000 attorneys.

Membership of networks may be open to accounting firms also, and accounting networks also form alliances with law networks. Some commentators take the position that bringing together a group of lawyers and accountants to create a multidisciplinary association ultimately benefits clients as they often need a wide range of professional services advisors when involved in large transactions, for example, when incorporating a new business or in litigation matters, when for lawyers, the litigation support services of accountants can be very valuable. Bringing lawyers and accountants together does not create a multidisciplinary practice (MDP), as all firms are separate legal entities. MDPs that involve law firms partnering with non-law firms remain highly regulated or forbidden in most nations and jurisdictions.

Functions

Retaining firm independence
Becoming part of a network may help firms serve new marketplaces while retaining independence, create economies of scale, and pool resources.

Client retention
Networks allow firms to refer their clients to similar-sized members in another jurisdiction, rather than lose clients to a larger international firm. Many firms believe that being part of a network provides clients with reassurance that they will receive similar levels of service from any firm in the network

Practice development
Networks allow firms to attract larger clients operating on a multi-jurisdictional basis. Others disagree that law firm networks offer practice development opportunities.

Advantages of exclusivity
Networks may offer firms exclusivity. This may be a city, state or country.

Branding
Membership in a network gives members the right to promote its affiliation in its territory using the network's logo. Use of the brand is encouraged, but not usually required, and would typically be implemented across firm stationery, marketing brochures and web pages.

Open discussion in a non-competitive environment
Many networks consist of non-competing firms and therefore provide their members with the opportunity to openly discuss issues affecting their firm.

See also
 Bar association
 Umbrella organization
 Business networking
 Professional services networks
 Multidisciplinary professional services networks
 Accounting networks and associations

References

Professional networks
 
Legal organizations